Home insurance, also commonly called homeowner's insurance (often abbreviated in the US real estate industry as HOI), is a type of property insurance that covers a private residence. It is an insurance policy that combines various personal insurance protections, which can include losses occurring to one's home, its contents, loss of use (additional living expenses), or loss of other personal possessions of the homeowner, as well as liability insurance for accidents that may happen at the home or at the hands of the homeowner within the policy territory.

Additionally, homeowner's insurance provides financial protection against disasters. A standard home insurance policy insures the home itself along with the things kept inside.

Overview 
Homeowner's policy is a multiple-line insurance policy, meaning that it includes both property insurance and liability coverage, with an indivisible premium, meaning that a single premium is paid for all risks. This means that it covers both damage to one's property and liability for any injuries and property damage caused by the owner or members of his/her family to other people. It may also include damage caused by household pets. The U.S. uses standardized policy forms that divide coverage into several categories. Coverage limits are typically provided as a percentage of the primary Coverage A, which is coverage for the main dwelling.

The cost of homeowner's insurance often depends on what it would cost to replace the house and which additional endorsements or riders are attached to the policy. The insurance policy is a legal contract between the insurance carrier (insurance company) and the named insured(s). It is a contract of indemnity and will put the insured back to the state he/she was in prior to the loss. Typically, claims due to floods or war (whose definition typically includes a nuclear explosion from any source) are excluded from coverage, amongst other standard exclusions (like termites). Special insurance can be purchased for these possibilities, including flood insurance. Insurance is adjusted to reflect the cost of replacement, usually upon application of an inflation factor or a cost index.

Pricing 

Major factors in price estimation include location, coverage, and the amount of insurance, which is based on the estimated cost to rebuild the home ("replacement cost").

If insufficient coverage is purchased to rebuild the home, the claim's payout may be subject to a co-insurance penalty. In this scenario, the insured will be subject to an out of pocket fee as a penalty. Insurers use vendors to estimate the costs, including CoreLogic subsidiary Marshall Swift-Boeckh, Verisk PropertyProfile, and E2Value, but leave the responsibility ultimately up to the consumer. In 2013, a survey found that about 60% of homes are undervalued by an estimated 17 percent. In some cases, estimates can be too low because of "demand surge" after a catastrophe. As a safeguard against a wrong estimate, some insurers offer "extended replacement cost" add-ons ("endorsements") which provide extra coverage if the limit is reached.

Prices may be lower if the house is situated next to a fire station or is equipped with fire sprinklers and fire alarms; if the house exhibits wind mitigation measures, such as hurricane shutters; or if the house has a security system and has insurer-approved locks installed.

Typically payment is made annually. Perpetual insurance which continues indefinitely can also be obtained in certain areas.

Covered perils
Home insurance offers coverage on a "named perils" and "open perils" basis. A "named perils" policy is one that provides coverage for a loss specifically listed on the policy; if it's not listed, then it's not covered. An "open perils" policy is broader in the sense that it will provide coverage for all losses except those specifically excluded on your policy.

For insurance policies that cover specific named perils, the insurer frequently offers a choice between one policy that will cover a basic set of specific perils, and another policy that covers the same basic set plus several additional perils, as discussed below. Together with an open peril, a.k.a. "special form"  policy, these two groupings of named perils allow the insurer to offer a choice among three types of policy, with three levels of coverage, which can be priced in a fair and accurate manner and appeal to a variety of resident homeowners as well as owners of apartment buildings and condominium associations.

Basic "named perils" – this is the least comprehensive of the three coverage options. It provides protection against perils most likely to result in a total loss. If something happens to your home that's not on the list below, you are not covered. This type of policy is most common in countries with developing insurance markets and as protection for vacant or unoccupied buildings.

Basic-form covered perils:
 Fire
 Lightning
 Windstorm or hail
 Explosion
 Smoke
 Vandalism
 Aircraft or vehicle collision
 Riot or civil commotion

Broad "named perils" – this form expands on the "basic form" by adding 6 more covered perils. Again, this is a "named perils" policy. The loss must specifically be listed to receive coverage. Fortunately, the "broad form" is designed to cover the most common forms of property damage.

Broad-form covered perils:
 All basic-form perils
 Burglary, break-in damage
 Falling objects (e.g. tree limbs)
 Weight of ice and snow
 Freezing of plumbing
 Accidental water damage
 Artificially generated electricity

Special "all risk" – special-form coverage is the most inclusive of the three options. The difference with "special form" policies is that they provide coverage to all losses unless specifically excluded. Unlike the prior forms, all unlisted perils are covered perils. However, if something happens to your home, and the event is on the exclusions list, the policy will not provide coverage.

Special-form excluded perils:
 Ordinance of law
 Earthquake
 Flood
 Power failure
 Neglect
 War
 Nuclear hazard
 Intentional acts

In the United States 

In the United States, most home buyers borrow money in the form of a mortgage loan, and the mortgage lender often requires that the buyer purchase homeowner's insurance as a condition of the loan, in order to protect the bank if the home is destroyed. Anyone with an insurable interest in the property should be listed on the policy. In some cases the mortgagee will waive the need for the mortgagor to carry homeowner's insurance if the value of the land exceeds the amount of the mortgage balance. In such a case even the total destruction of any buildings would not affect the ability of the lender to be able to foreclose and recover the full amount of the loan.

Home insurance in the United States may differ from other countries; for example, in Britain, subsidence and subsequent foundation failure is usually covered under an insurance policy. United States insurance companies used to offer foundation insurance, which was reduced to coverage for damage due to leaks, and finally eliminated altogether. The insurance is often misunderstood by its purchasers; for example, many believe that mold is covered when it is not a standard coverage.

History 
The first homeowner's policy per se in the United States was introduced in September 1950, but similar policies had already existed in Great Britain and certain areas of the United States. In the late 1940s, US insurance law was reformed and during this process multiple line statutes were written, allowing homeowner's policies to become legal.

Prior to the 1950s there were separate policies for the various perils that could affect a home. A homeowner would have had to purchase separate policies covering fire losses, theft, personal property, and the like. During the 1950s policy forms were developed allowing the homeowner to purchase all the insurance they needed on one complete policy. However, these policies varied by insurance company, and were difficult to comprehend.

The need for standardization grew so great that a private company based in Jersey City, New Jersey, Insurance Services Office, also known as the ISO, was formed in 1971 to provide risk information and it issued simplified homeowner's policy forms for reselling to insurance companies. These policies have been amended over the years.

Modern developments have changed the insurance coverage terms, availability, and pricing. Homeowner's insurance has been relatively unprofitable, due in part to catastrophes such as hurricanes as well as regulators' reluctance to authorize price increases. Coverages have been reduced instead and companies have diverged from the former standardized model ISO forms. Water damage due to burst pipes in particular has been restricted or in some cases entirely eliminated. Other restrictions included time limits, complex replacement cost calculations (which may not reflect the true cost to replace), and reductions in wind damage coverage.

Types of homeowners insurance policies 

According to a 2018 National Association of Insurance Commissioners (NAIC) report on data from 2016, 73.8% of homes were covered by owner-occupied homeowners' policies. Of these, 79.52% had an HO-3 Special policy, and 13.35% had the more expensive HO-5 Comprehensive. Both of these policies are "all risks" or "open perils", meaning that they cover all perils except those specifically excluded. Homes covered by an HO-2 Broad policy accounted for 5.15%, which covers only specific named perils. The remaining 2% includes the HO-1 Basic and the HO-8 Modified policies, which are the most limited in the coverage offered. HO-8, also known as older home insurance, is likely to pay only actual cash value for damages rather than replacement.

The remaining 21.3% of home insurance policies were covered by renter's or condominium insurance. 14.8% of these had the HO-4 Contents Broad form, also known as renters' insurance, which covers the contents of an apartment not specifically covered in the blanket policy written for the complex. This policy can also cover liability arising from injury to guests as well as negligence of the renter within the coverage territory. Common coverage areas are events such as lightning, riot, aircraft, explosion, vandalism, smoke, theft, windstorm or hail, falling objects, volcanic eruption, snow, sleet, and weight of ice. The remainder had the HO-6 Unit-Owners policy, also known as a condominium insurance, which is designed for the owners of condos and includes coverage for the part of the building owned by the insured and for the property housed therein. Designed to span the gap between the coverage provided by the blanket policy written for the entire neighborhood or building and the personal property inside the home. The condominium association's by-laws may determine the total amount of insurance necessary. E.g., in Florida, the scope of coverage is prescribed by statute – 718.111(11)(f).

Collateral protection insurance 
If a home can't be insured, obtaining a mortgage on it is difficult or impossible. If the homeowner's insurance is canceled after a mortgage agreement is in force, and the home judged to be uninsurable, a standard mortgage contract that compels homeowner's insurance allows the lender to purchase collateral protection insurance, (sometimes called "force-placed insurance") and charge the premiums to the homeowner via escrow. CPI's pay off the balance owed on the mortgage if the homeowner defaults on mortgage payments, and some will cover damage to the home that impacts the resale value. This repair coverage can benefit the homeowner, but by design the contractual benefits flow to the mortgagee. If the structure is deemed uninsurable, the homeowner also benefits from not having the mortgage called in by the lender - without CPI the homeowner would be in serious breach of his contractual obligations.

Causes of loss 
According to the 2008 Insurance Information Institute factbook, for every $100 of premium, in 2005 on average $16 went to fire and lightning, $30 to wind and hail, $11 to water damage and freezing, $4 for other causes, and $2 for theft. An additional $3 went to liability and medical payments and $9 for claims settlement expenses, and the remaining $25 was allocated to insurer expenses. One study of fires found that most were caused by heating incidents, although smoking was a risk factor for fatal fires.

Claims process 
After a loss, the insured is expected to take steps to mitigate the loss. Insurance policies typically require that the insurer be notified within a reasonable time period. After that, a claims adjuster will investigate the claim and the insured may be required to provide various information.

Filing a claim may result in an increase in rates, or in nonrenewal or cancellation. In addition, insurers may share the claim data in an industry database (the two major ones are CLUE and A-PLUS), with Claim Loss Underwriting Exchange (CLUE) by Choicepoint receiving data from 98% of U.S. insurers.

In the United Kingdom 

As in the US, mortgage lenders within the United Kingdom (UK) require the rebuild value (the actual cost of rebuilding a property to its current state should it be damaged or destroyed) of a property to be covered as a condition of the loan. However, the rebuild cost is often lower than the market value of the property, as the market value often reflects the property as a going concern, as opposed to just the value of the bricks and mortar.

A number of factors, such as an increase in fraud and increasingly unpredictable weather, have seen home insurance premiums continue to rise in the UK. For this reason, there has been a shift in how home insurance is bought in the UK—as customers become a lot more price-sensitive, there has been a large increase in the amount of policies sold through price comparison sites.

In addition to standard home insurance, some 8 million households in the UK are categorized as being a "non-standard" risk. These households  require a specialist or non-standard insurer that would cover home insurance needs for people that have criminal convictions and/or where the property suffers subsidence or has previously been underpinned.

Around the world 
Premium volume by country (2013)

Building and contents coverage

Countries such as China, Australia, and the United Kingdom use a more straightforward approach to home insurance, called "building and contents coverage" commonly referred to as "home and contents insurance". Relative to the insurance policies of the United States, building and contents coverage offers a very basic level of coverage. Most standard policies only cover the most basic perils listed below:
 Storm or flood
 Fire
 Lightning or explosion
 Falling trees or branches
 Subsidence, drag or landslip
 Breakage of glass or sanitary fittings
 Damage from escaped water or oil
 Shock caused to the house by animals, vehicles or aircraft

Building coverage

Building covers both the primary structure as well as detached structures such as garages, sheds, and back houses that are on property. However, different insurers may not cover things like boundary walls, fences, gates, paths, drives or swimming pools, so it is important to check the specific policy language. This is an equivalent of both Coverage A and B in homeowners insurance policies in the United States.

Contents coverage

Contents insurance covers personal effects such as furniture, clothes, electronics, jewelry, etc. Most policies limit the individual amount of money paid out for each category of items. Individual policies can vary in the amount of coverage they provide. The option to schedule your personal property is readily available.

Liability coverage

Liability is typically bundled together with building and contents coverage. Injuries and damage on premises would be covered by building coverage liability while any offsite occurrences would be covered under contents coverage.

Common exclusions

As with most insurance policies, there are always exclusions. The most common are:
 General wear-and-tear maintenance
 Faulty workmanship
 Mechanical or electrical breakdown
 Any amount over the limits shown on the policy schedule or in the policy
 Restricted cover when the home is empty or is let to tenants

See also
Mortgage insurance
Home equity protection
Owner-controlled insurance program
Property insurance
Renters insurance

References

Types of insurance